State Route 232 (SR 232) is a state highway in the U.S. state of California that runs along Vineyard Avenue in Ventura County, serving as a connector between US 101 in Oxnard and SR 118 near Saticoy.

Route description
It starts on Vineyard Avenue at the U.S. Route 101 interchange near the Martinez Shopping Center, and runs through El Rio. SR 232 leaves the Oxnard city limits and ends at Los Angeles Avenue (Route 118).

SR 232 is part of the California Freeway and Expressway System, and is part of the National Highway System, a network of highways that are considered essential to the country's economy, defense, and mobility by the Federal Highway Administration.

History
At the 1932 Summer Olympics near Los Angeles, it hosted part of the road cycling event when it was Vineyard Avenue. Route 154 was defined in 1933 from El Rio to Saticoy; the route was renumbered as SR 232 in the 1964 state highway renumbering. By 2014, the route was redefined to start at US 101, eliminating the part in Oxnard that had been relinquished.

Major intersections

See also

References

External links

California Highways: SR 232
California @ AARoads.com - State Route 232
Caltrans: Route 232 highway conditions
2003 Caltrans District 7 Master System Plan Status Map

Venues of the 1932 Summer Olympics
Olympic cycling venues
232
State Route 232
State Route 232